Neshyba Peak is a small, sharp peak, mostly snow-covered, surmounting the north part of a complex ridge 16 nautical miles (30 km) east-northeast of Mount Jackson, in east Palmer Land. Mapped by United States Geological Survey (USGS) in 1974. Named by Advisory Committee on Antarctic Names (US-ACAN) for Stephen Neshyba, United States Antarctic Research Program (USARP) oceanographer who studied the laminar structure of the bottom water in the Antarctic Peninsula area, 1972–73.

Mountains of Palmer Land